Hilton Clarke (born 3 September 1944) is an Australian former cyclist. He competed in the tandem and the 1000m time trial at the 1968 Summer Olympics. He has won 17 Australian titles. Hilton has three sons - Troy, Hilton Jnr. and Jonathan - all of whom have raced at the elite level. He is a member of Carnegie Caulfield Cycling Club

Racing career

Australian Titles

1966
 1000m Time Trial (Amateur)
 4km Team Pursuit (Amateur)

1967
 1000m Time Trial (Amateur)
 10 mile Scratch Race (Amateur)
 4km Team Pursuit (Amateur)

1968
 1000m Time Trial (Amateur)
 4km Team Pursuit (Amateur)

1969
 4km Team Pursuit (Pro)

1970
 1 mile Scratch Race (Pro)
 5 mile Scratch Race (Pro)

1971
 5 mile Scratch Race (Pro)

1972
 5 mile Scratch Race (Pro)

1974
 1000m Time Trial (Pro)
 Madison (Pro)

1975
 4km Team Pursuit (Pro)

1976
 10km Scratch Race (Pro)
 4km Team Pursuit (Pro)

References

External links
 

1944 births
Living people
Australian male cyclists
Olympic cyclists of Australia
Cyclists at the 1968 Summer Olympics
Cyclists from Melbourne
Commonwealth Games medallists in cycling
Commonwealth Games silver medallists for Australia
Cyclists at the 1966 British Empire and Commonwealth Games
20th-century Australian people
21st-century Australian people
Sportsmen from Victoria (Australia)
Medallists at the 1966 British Empire and Commonwealth Games